Tobias Kamke was the defending champion but chose not to participate.

Arthur De Greef won the title after defeating Steve Darcis 7–6(7–4), 6–3 in the final.

Seeds

Draw

Finals

Top half

Bottom half

References
Main Draw
Qualifying Draw

Svijany Open - Singles